Aphetic may refer to:

Apheresis (linguistics), a term in phonetics
 'relating to the apheta ', or aphetic place, a term in astrology (from the Greek word for 'start-point')